The 1984 Miami Hurricanes baseball team represented the University of Miami in the 1984 NCAA Division I baseball season. The Hurricanes played their home games at Mark Light Field. The team was coached by Ron Fraser in his 22nd season at Miami.

The Hurricanes reached the College World Series, where they were eliminated after recording a win against  and losses to eventual fourth-place  and champion Cal State Fullerton.

Personnel

Roster

Coaches

Schedule and results

References

Miami Hurricanes baseball seasons
Miami Hurricanes
College World Series seasons
Miami Hurricanes baseball